Maggio is a surname. Notable people with the surname include:

Christian Maggio (born 1982), Italian football midfielder
Dante Maggio (1909–1992), Italian film actor
Jaime Maggio, NBA on TNT reporter
Jorge Maggio (born 1982), Argentine actor
Mattia Maggio (born 1994), German-Italian footballer
Veronica Maggio (born 1981), Swedish singer
Baldassare Di Maggio (born 1954), Mafia member

See also
Maggio drammatico
Maggio Musicale Fiorentino, an annual opera festival

Surnames of Italian origin
Surnames from nicknames